Kris Lemche (born 1978 or 1979) is a Canadian actor.

Career
At 17 years old,  Lemche answered a newspaper casting call and won a role on the Disney series Flash Forward.

Abandoning plans to study biochemistry in University, Lemche instead moved to Prince Edward Island to work on the CBC series Emily of New Moon. His work on the show earned him a Gemini Award.

In 2015, Lemche was cast as the lead in the drama pilot Tales From The Darkside, a remake of the 1980s horror/fantasy/thriller anthology series; ultimately, the Tales From The Darkside pilot was not picked up by a television network.

Filmography

Film

Television

References

External links
 
 Kris Lemche at NorthernStars.ca

1978 births
Living people
20th-century Canadian male actors
21st-century Canadian male actors
Canadian male film actors
Canadian male television actors
Best Supporting Actor in a Drama Series Canadian Screen Award winners
People from Brampton
Male actors from Ontario